Kebili Governorate is the second largest of the 24 governorates (provinces) of Tunisia. It is situated in south-western Tunisia, bordering Algeria. The capital is Kebili.

Geography
Kebili climate is very difficult in winter (very cold at night) and in summer (high temperature). The region is very nice to visit in spring and in the end of autumn.

Kebili contains a significant part of Tunisia's largest salt pan, which is known as Chott el-Jerid, as well as the western end of Chott el Fejej.

Administrative divisions
Kebili Governorate is subdivided into six delegations:
Douz North
Douz South
Faouar
Kebili North
Kebili South
Souk El Ahed

The following five municipalities are located in Kebili Governorate:

References 

 
Governorates of Tunisia